Punnapra is a village in Alappuzha district of Kerala, India. It is a coastal area of the Arabian Sea and lies west to Kuttanad, popularly known as The rice bowl of Kerala.

Local Governance
Punnapra is divided into 2 panchayats:
Punnapra North
Punnapra South

History

Punnapra was part of the princely state of Travancore before the independence of India. In 1940s, Communist party developed a good influence among the workers in the coir industry and organised a strike for better wages. Sir C. P. Ramaswami Iyer, the diwan(prime minister) of Travancore intervened to resolve the labour issues, but situation worsened with the faction of workers demanding for Responsible Government, a political move against the rule of Sir C. P. Ramaswami Iyer. A landlord, Applon Aroj in Punnapra was given with police protection on demand and one demonstrator was shot dead in an agitation near to his house. A large number of strikers attacked the police camp, killed a four policemen and about 35 strikers were also killed. Government declared martial law and in the following army action about 300 people were massacred. The series of incidents is known as Punnapra-Vayalar uprising. There is a memorial known as the Punnapra-Vayalar uprising martyrs' column and every year, a procession is held from Valya chudukad in Alappuzha to the memorial on the date.

Colleges in Punnapra

 College of Engineering and Management, Punnapra
 Government T D Medical College, Alappuzha
 Carmel Polytechnic College, Aravukad
 Carmel College of Engineering and Technology Alappuzha
 Mar Gregorios College Punnapra

References

Villages in Alappuzha district